KBIM may refer to:

 KBIM (AM), a radio station (910 kHz) licensed to Roswell, New Mexico, United States
 KBIM-FM, a radio station (94.9 MHz) licensed to Roswell, New Mexico
 KBIM-TV, a television station (channel 10 digital) licensed to Roswell, New Mexico